Tricliceras bivinianum is an annual herb in Tricliceras, Turneroideae (Passifloraceae). It's endemic to Sudan Ethiopia, Tanzania, Zanzibar, and Madagascar. T. bivinianum can grow up to 0.5 meters tall and produce yellow flowers.

References 

Passifloraceae